Crăciunescu is a surname of Romanian origin. People with that name include:
 Florența Crăciunescu (1955-2008), Romanian athlete (discus and shot put) who competed in the 1980 and 1984 Summer Olympics
 Ion Crăciunescu (born 1950), Romanian former football referee
 Ioana Crăciunescu (born 1950), Romanian actress and poet

See also
 

Surnames of Romanian origin